Penrith Rugby Football Club is an English rugby union team based in Penrith, Cumbria. The club runs two senior male sides, a senior ladies team, a colts team, ex-players team and has a thriving junior section boasting both boys and girls teams through all ages.  The first XV currently plays in Regional 2 North following a league restructure at the end of the 2021/22 season.

Club honours

1st team:
Cumbria Cup winners (8): 1960, 2000, 2005, 2006, 2009, 2010, 2011, 2012, 2019
North Lancashire/Cumbria v South Lancs/Cheshire 1 promotion playoff winners: 2002-03
North Division 2 East champions (2): 2005–06, 2008-09

2nd team:
Cumbria Shield winners (3): 2004, 2005, 2007, 2022

3rd team:
Cumbria Shield winners (2): 2014, 2015
Cumbria Vase winners: 2015

References

External links
Official club website

English rugby union teams
Rugby clubs established in 1881
Rugby union in Cumbria
Penrith, Cumbria
1881 establishments in England